Quamut is a collection of how-to guides launched in March 2008 by the bookstore chain Barnes & Noble. The core line of guides are all editorially written, but there is also a section of user-contributed wiki guides. Quamut is formed from quam, the Latin word for "how", and ut, the Latin word for "to". It is pronounced /ˈkʷamut/.

Like its competitors Google Knol, Squidoo, and WikiAnswers, it generates revenue by the placement of relevant advertisement using Google's AdSense program. Additionally, Quamut guides are sold online as PDFs, and a selection are available for purchase as laminated charts in Barnes & Noble stores and from bn.com.

In August 2009 Barnes & Noble shut down Quamut, though the print charts continue to be available.

References
Wikipedia vs. the World By Rick Aristotle Munarriz, March 31, 2008, The Motley Fool. Accessed April 2008
B&N Launches How-To Site Quamut.com By Lynn Andriani, Publishers Weekly,  March 24, 2008
B&N Shutters Quamut August 18, 2009

External links
Quamut Charts

Internet properties established in 2008
American educational websites
Knowledge markets
How-to websites
Barnes & Noble